Daaku Dilruba is a Hindi action movie of Bollywood directed by William Hant and produced by J. Neelam This movie was released on 14 July 2000 in the banner of Deep Jyoti Films.

Plot
This is a revenge and love story of a village girl. The teenage girl is brutally raped by a few men of the village. She becomes a dacoit as Daaku Dilruba and kills all the rapists.

Cast
 Mohan Joshi
 Raza Murad
 Kiran Kumar
 Joginder
 Vinod Tripathi
 Anil Nagrath
 Satnam Kaur
 Yamini
 Arvind Jaiswal
 Shravani Goswami
 Shakeel Shetty
 Gautham

References

External links
 

2000 films
2000s Hindi-language films
Indian action films
Indian rape and revenge films
Films about outlaws
Indian films about revenge
2000 action films
Hindi-language action films